The 2012–13 Serbian Cup season is the seventh season of the Serbian national football tournament.

The competition started on 5 September 2012 and concluded with the Final on 8 May 2013.

The winner of the competition will qualify for the 2013–14 UEFA Europa League.

Preliminary round
A preliminary round was held in order to reduce the number of teams competing in the next round to 32. It consisted of 7 single-legged ties, with penalty shoot-out as decider, if the score was tied after 90 minutes. Appearing in this round were bottom 9 teams from 2011–12 Serbian First League, as well as 5 regional cup winners. The draw contained seeded and unseeded teams. Bottom 9 teams from 2011–12 Serbian First League (RFK Novi Sad, OFK Mladenovac, Kolubara, Čukarički, Banat, Radnički Sombor, Mladi Radnik, Sinđelić Niš and Srem) were set as seeded teams, with 5 regional cup winners (Dunav, Kovačevac, Timok, Jedinstvo Užice and Trepča) being set as unseeded teams. After drawing 5 seeded-unseeded match-ups, remaining 2 fixtures were determined by regular draw, without seeds. The matches were played on 5 and 12 September 2012.

Round of 32
In this round, seven winners from the previous round will be joined by all 16 teams from Serbian Superliga from 2011–12, as well as top 9 teams from Serbian First League from 2011–12. The draw contained seeded and unseeded teams. 16 teams from 2011–12 Serbian SuperLiga (Partizan, Red Star, Vojvodina, Jagodina, Sloboda Užice, Radnički 1923, Spartak Subotica, OFK Beograd, Javor, Rad, Hajduk Kula, BSK Borča, Smederevo, Novi Pazar, Borac Čačak (II) and Metalac (II)) were set as seeded teams. Draw was held on 13 September 2012. The matches were played on 26 September 2012. No extra time was played if the score was tied after regular 90 minutes, with games going straight into penalties.

Round of 16
16 winners from first round took part in this stage of the competition. The draw was held on 4 October 2012 and contained seeded and unseeded teams. Seedings were determined by last seasons final standings in top two Serbian divisions. Seeded teams: Partizan, Red Star, Vojvodina, Jagodina, Spartak Subotica, OFK Beograd, Javor and Rad. Unseeded teams: Hajduk Kula, Smederevo, Novi Pazar, Borac Čačak (II), Metalac (II), Inđija (II), RFK Novi Sad (II) and Čukarički (II). The matches were scheduled for 24 and 31 October 2012. No extra time was played in case of tie after 90 minutes. Those games went straight into penalty shoot-out.

Quarter-finals
8 winners from Last 16 took part in this stage of the competition. The draw was held 2 November 2012 and contained seeded and unseeded teams. Seedings were determined by following key: Last season's cup semifinalists were automatically set as seeded teams, with remaining seeds determined by last season final standings in top two Serbian divisions. Seeded teams: Red Star, Borac Čačak (II), Vojvodina and Jagodina. Unseeded teams: Spartak Subotica, OFK Beograd, Javor, and Rad.
The matches were played on 21 November 2012. No extra time was played in case of tie after 90 minutes. Those games went straight into penalty shoot-out.

Semi-finals
4 winners from Quarter finals (Vojvodina, Jagodina, OFK Beograd and Javor) took part in this stage of the competition. Semi-finals were contested over two legs. Aggregate winners qualified for the Cup finals. If the scores are tied over two legs, away goals rule will be used. If the score is still tied extra-time will be played, with penalty shoot-out to follow if the aggregate score is tied after extra-time. The draw was held on 12 December 2012. There were no seedings in the draw. First legs were played on 13 March 2013, while second legs were played on 17 April 2013.

|}

First legs

Second legs

Final
2 winners from Semi-finals took part in the single-legged final. Extra time is played if the score is tied after 90 minutes, with penalty shoot-out to follow if the score is still tied after extra time. The final game was played on 8 May 2013, at Partizan Stadium in Belgrade.

References

External links
 Official site

Serbian Cup seasons
Cup
Serbian Cup